A mole hole, officially designated the Readiness Crew Building (RCB), is a type of structure built by the United States Air Force at former Strategic Air Command (SAC) bases around the country during the 1950s and 1960s.  RCBs were located adjacent to an Alert Ramp, also called a "Christmas Tree", where Ready Alert aircraft were parked.  These aircraft were initially Boeing B-47 Stratojet aircraft armed with nuclear weapons, augmented by Boeing KC-97 Stratofreighter aerial refueling aircraft.  As SAC introduced newer bomber and aerial tanker aircraft into its inventory, the B-47 and KC-97 were later superseded by Boeing B-52 Stratofortress, Convair B-58 Hustler, General Dynamics FB-111 or Rockwell B-1 Lancer bombers, augmented by Boeing KC-135 Stratotanker or McDonnell Douglas KC-10 Extender aerial refueling aircraft.

History
Due to aircraft being parked at the "Christmas Tree" being on constant alert duty, the Strategic Air Command realized that they needed specialized buildings to house crews who rotated on alert duty. In 1958, Leo A Daly, an architect from Omaha, Nebraska, was hired to design buildings that would respectively hold 70, 100, and 150 men. These standardized structures would eventually be nicknamed "mole holes" due to the fact that the men would run out onto the "Christmas Tree" through corrugated steel tunnels attached to the lower level of the building when the alert Klaxon sounded. The buildings would house readiness crews and contained thick concrete exteriors, bathrooms, a briefing room for crew members, dormitories, several classrooms, a kitchen and a dining facility.  Since crews were typically assigned on alert for seven-day periods, some installations would later incorporate outdoor athletic facilities on site, such as baseball fields or swimming pools, as well as picnic facilities where families could visit crewmembers on duty.  

Crews on alert duty would typically be on alert for seven days out of a 21-day period, while being on rotational alert duty. During their alert duty, they would fly no training missions, as they were to be kept always ready for an operational launch in the event of a nuclear strike. 

During an alert scramble, flight crews and ground crews would run out to the "Christmas Tree", where they would travel on foot and/or by waiting alert vehicles to the alert bomber and tanker aircraft that were waiting to launch, typically between four and nine in number.  Once all engines were started, the aircraft would perform an elephant walk to the runway, where a Minimum Interval Takeoff (MITO) might be performed.

Over the course of their construction, eleven facilities to house 150 people were built.  These were supplemented by an additional ten facilities for housing 100 men, and 45 facilities for housing 70 men at a total of 65 SAC bases, other USAF bases where a SAC wing was a tenant command, and Royal Canadian Air Force bases where an SAC wing was present. The facilities replaced various facilities that housed crew members earlier, including house trailers, which sat next to the aircraft.

Locations 

Readiness Crew Buildings designed to accommodate 150 Airmen were located at the following Air Force Bases:

 Bunker Hill AFB (Indiana)
 Forbes AFB (Kansas)
 Hunter AFB (Georgia)
 Lincoln AFB (Nebraska)
 Lockbourne AFB (Ohio)

 Malmstrom AFB (Montana)
 Mountain Home AFB (Idaho)
 Pease AFB (New Hampshire)
 Plattsburgh AFB (New York) 
 R.I. Bong AFB (Wisconsin)
 Whiteman AFB (Missouri)

Readiness Crew Buildings designed to accommodate 100 Airmen were located at the following Air Force Bases:

 Chennault AFB (Louisiana)
 Clinton County AFB (Ohio)
 Davis-Monthan AFB (Arizona)
 Dyess AFB (Texas)
 Homestead AFB (Florida)
 Little Rock AFB (Arkansas)
 MacDill AFB (Florida)
 March AFB (California)
 McCoy AFB (Florida)
 Selfridge AFB (Michigan)
 Ernest Harmon (Newfoundland, Canada)

Readiness Crew Buildings designed to accommodate 70 Airmen were located at the following Air Force Bases:

 Altus AFB (Oklahoma)
 Amarillo AFB (Texas)
 Barksdale AFB (Louisiana)
 Beale AFB (California)
 Bergstrom AFB (Texas)
 Biggs AFB (Texas)
 Blytheville AFB (Arkansas)
 Carswell AFB (Texas)
 Castle AFB (California) 
 Clinton-Sherman AFB (Oklahoma)
 Columbus AFB (Mississippi)
 Dow AFB (Maine)
 Dover AFB (Delaware)
 Eglin AFB (Florida)
 Ellsworth AFB (South Dakota)
 Fairchild AFB (Washington)
 Glasgow AFB (Montana)
 Grand Forks AFB (North Dakota)
 Griffiss AFB (New York)
 Kinross AFB (Michigan)
 K.I. Sawyer AFB (Michigan)
 Larson AFB (Washington)
 Loring AFB (Maine)
 Mather AFB (California)
 McChord AFB (Washington)
 McGuire AFB (New Jersey)
 Minot AFB (North Dakota)
 Otis AFB (Massachusetts)
 Ramey AFB (Puerto Rico)
 Robins AFB (Georgia)
 Schilling AFB (Kansas)
 Seymour-Johnson AFB (North Carolina)
 Sheppard AFB (Texas)
 Travis AFB (California)
 Turner AFB (Georgia)
 Walker AFB (New Mexico)
 Westover AFB (Massachusetts)
 Wright-Patterson AFB (Ohio)
 Wurtsmith AFB (Michigan)

In addition to the United States Air Force bases listed above, Readiness Crew Buildings designed to accommodate 70 Airmen were also operated at the following Royal Canadian Air Force bases:

 Goose Bay (RCAF, Labrador, Canada)
 Cold Lake  (RCAF, Alberta, Canada)
 Churchill (RCAF, Manitoba, Canada)
 Namao (RCAF, Alberta, Canada)
 Frobisher Bay (RCAF, Nunavut, Canada)

References

External links
 

United States Air Force